A number of words are derived from the carbine firearm:
 Carabinier, a carbine-carrying cavalry soldier
 Carabinieri, the Italian gendarmerie
 Carabineros de Chile, the Chilean police.
 Carabiner, a rope connecting device